This is a list of Penicillium species. The genus has over 300 species.

Species

A

 Penicillium abidjanum
 Penicillium adametzii 
 Penicillium adametzioides
 Penicillium aeris
 Penicillium aethiopicum
 Penicillium albicans
 Penicillium albidum 
 Penicillium albocoremium
 Penicillium alexiae
 Penicillium alfredii
 Penicillium alicantinum
 Penicillium allahabadense 
 Penicillium allii
 Penicillium allii-sativi
 Penicillium alogum 
 Penicillium alutaceum 
 Penicillium anatolicum
 Penicillium amagasakiense
 Penicillium amaliae
 Penicillium amphipolaria 
 Penicillium anatolicum
 Penicillium angulare
 Penicillium angustiporcatum
 Penicillium antarcticum
 Penicillium annulatum 
 Penicillium aotearoae 
 Penicillium araracuarense
 Penicillium ardesiacum
 Penicillium arenicola
 Penicillium aragonense
 Penicillium arianeae
 Penicillium ardesiacum
 Penicillium arenicola 
 Penicillium argentinense
 Penicillium armarii
 Penicillium astrolabium
 Penicillium asturianum
 Penicillium atramentosum
 Penicillium athertonense
 Penicillium atrolazulinum 
 Penicillium attenuatum 
 Penicillium atrosanguineum
 Penicillium atrovenetum
 Penicillium austricola 
 Penicillium aurantiacobrunneum
 Penicillium aurantiogriseum
 Penicillium aureocephalum 
 Penicillium austroafricanum
 Penicillium austrosinicum

B

 Penicillium bilaiae
 Penicillium bissettii 
 Penicillium boreae
 Penicillium bovifimosum
 Penicillium brasilianum
 Penicillium brasiliense
 Penicillium brefeldianum
 Penicillium brevicompactum
 Penicillium brevissimum
 Penicillium brevistipitatum
 Penicillium brocae
 Penicillium brunneoconidiatum
 Penicillium brunneum
 Penicillium buchwaldii
 Penicillium burgense
 Penicillium bussumense

C

 Penicillium caerulescens
 Penicillium cainii
 Penicillium cairnsense
 Penicillium calidicanium 
 Penicillium camemberti
 Penicillium camponotum
 Penicillium canariense 
 Penicillium canescens
 Penicillium canis
 Penicillium cantabricum
 Penicillium caperatum
 Penicillium capsulatum
 Penicillium carneum
 Penicillium cartierense
 Penicillium caseifulvum
 Penicillium catalonicum
 Penicillium cataractarum
 Penicillium catenatum
 Penicillium cavernicola
 Penicillium cecidicola
 Penicillium cellarum
 Penicillium chalabudae
 Penicillium chalybeum
 Penicillium charlesii
 Penicillium chermesinum 
 Penicillium choerospondiatis 
 Penicillium christenseniae
 Penicillium chroogomphum
 Penicillium chrysogenum 
 Penicillium cinnamopurpureum
 Penicillium citrinum
 Penicillium citrioviride
 Penicillium clavigerum
 Penicillium clavistipitatum
 Penicillium claviforme
 Penicillium cluniae
 Penicillium coalescens 
 Penicillium coccotrypicola 
 Penicillium coeruleum
 Penicillium coffeae
 Penicillium columnare
 Penicillium commune
 Penicillium compactum
 Penicillium concentricum 
 Penicillium confertum
 Penicillium contaminatum
 Penicillium coprobium
 Penicillium coprophilum
 Penicillium copticola
 Penicillium coralligerum
 Penicillium corylophilum
 Penicillium corynephorum
 Penicillium corvianum 
 Penicillium cosmopolitanum
 Penicillium cremeogriseum
 Penicillium crustosum
 Penicillium cryptum
 Penicillium crystallinum
 Penicillium costaricense
 Penicillium cravenianum
 Penicillium curticaule
 Penicillium cvjetkovicii 
 Penicillium cyaneum

D

 Penicillium daejeonium
 Penicillium daleae
 Penicillium decaturense
 Penicillium decumbens
 Penicillium dendriticum
 Penicillium desertorum
 Penicillium diabolicalicense 
 Penicillium dierckxii
 Penicillium digitatum
 Penicillium dimorphosporum
 Penicillium dipodomyicola
 Penicillium dipodomyis
 Penicillium discolor
 Penicillium diversum 
 Penicillium dodgei
 Penicillium donkii
 Penicillium dravuni 
 Penicillium duclauxii 
 Penicillium dunedinense

E

 Penicillium echinulatum
 Penicillium elleniae
 Penicillium ellipsoideosporum
 Penicillium emmonsii
 Penicillium erubescens
 Penicillium euglaucum
 Penicillium erythromellis
 Penicillium estinogenum 
 Penicillium excelsum
 Penicillium expansum

F

 Penicillium fasciculatum
 Penicillium fennelliae
 Penicillium fimorum
 Penicillium flavescens
 Penicillium flavidostipitatum
 Penicillium flavigenum
 Penicillium flavisclerotiatum
 Penicillium fluviserpens
 Penicillium formosanum
 Penicillium fractum
 Penicillium freii 
 Penicillium funiculosum
 Penicillium fundyense
 Penicillium fusisporum

G

 Penicillium georgiense
 Penicillium giganteum
 Penicillium gladioli
 Penicillium glabrum
 Penicillium glandicola
 Penicillium glaucoalbidum
 Penicillium glaucum
 Penicillium glycyrrhizacola 
 Penicillium goetzii
 Penicillium gossypii  
 Penicillium gorlenkoanum
 Penicillium gracilentum 
 Penicillium grevilleicola
 Penicillium griseofulvum
 Penicillium griseolum
 Penicillium griseopurpureum
 Penicillium griseum
 Penicillium guanacastense

H

 Penicillium halotolerans
 Penicillium hemitrachum 
 Penicillium hennebertii 
 Penicillium herquei 
 Penicillium heteromorphum  
 Penicillium hetheringtonii
 Penicillium hirayamae
 Penicillium hirsutum
 Penicillium hispanicum 
 Penicillium humicola
 Penicillium hoeksii
 Penicillium hordei 
 Penicillium humicoloides
 Penicillium humuli  
 Penicillium hypomycetis

I

 Penicillium ianthinellum
 Penicillium idahoense
 Penicillium implicatum 
 Penicillium improvisum
 Penicillium incoloratum 
 Penicillium indonesiae
 Penicillium inflatum 
 Penicillium intermedium 
 Penicillium infra-aurantiacum
 Penicillium infrabuccalum
 Penicillium infrapurpureum 
 Penicillium imranianum 
 Penicillium inusitatum  
 Penicillium isariiforme 
 Penicillium islandicum 
 Penicillium italicum

J

 Penicillium jacksonii
 Penicillium jamesonlandense
 Penicillium janczewskii 
 Penicillium javanicum
 Penicillium jejuense
 Penicillium jensenii  
 Penicillium jiangxiense
 Penicillium johnkrugii
 Penicillium jugoslavicum

K

 Penicillium kananaskense
 Penicillium kenraperi 
 Penicillium kiamaense
 Penicillium klebahnii 
 Penicillium kloeckeri 
 Penicillium kojigenum
 Penicillium kongii 
 Penicillium koreense

L

 Penicillium lacus-sarmientei
 Penicillium laeve 
 Penicillium lapatayae  
 Penicillium lapidosum 
 Penicillium lassenii 
 Penicillium lemhiflumine 
 Penicillium lehmanii 
 Penicillium lenticrescens
 Penicillium levitum
 Penicillium lignorum 
 Penicillium limosum 
 Penicillium lineatum 
 Penicillium loliense
 Penicillium longicatenatum 
 Penicillium ludwigii

M

 Penicillium macrosclerotiorum
 Penicillium maclennaniae  
 Penicillium madriti 
 Penicillium magnielliptisporum
 Penicillium malacaense
 Penicillium malacosphaerulum 
 Penicillium mallochii
 Penicillium malmesburiense
 Penicillium mariae-crucis 
 Penicillium marinum
 Penicillium marthae-christensenia
 Penicillium maximae 
 Penicillium megasporum  
 Penicillium melanoconidium 
 Penicillium melinii 
 Penicillium menonorum
 Penicillium meloforme  
 Penicillium meridianum
 Penicillium mexicanum
 Penicillium miczynskii 
 Penicillium momoii
 Penicillium mimosinum 
 Penicillium minioluteum 
 Penicillium moldavicum  
 Penicillium molle
 Penicillium mononematosum
 Penicillium monsgalena
 Penicillium monsserratidens
 Penicillium montanense 
 Penicillium multicolor  
 Penicillium murcianum

N

 Penicillium nalgiovense 
 Penicillium neocrassum 
 Penicillium neoechinulatum 
 Penicillium neomiczynskii 	
 Penicillium nepalense 
 Penicillium nilense 
 Penicillium nodositatum 
 Penicillium nodulum
 Penicillium nordicum  
 Penicillium nothofagi 
 Penicillium novae-zelandiae 
 Penicillium nucicola

O

 Penicillium ochotense
 Penicillium oblatum 
 Penicillium occitanis  
 Penicillium ochrochloron 
 Penicillium ochrosalmoneum 
 Penicillium olsonii  
 Penicillium onobense 
 Penicillium oregonense  
 Penicillium ootensis  
 Penicillium ornatum
 Penicillium ortum  
 Penicillium osmophilum 
 Penicillium ovatum 
 Penicillium oxalicum

P

 Penicillium pagulum 
 Penicillium pachmariensis  
 Penicillium palitans 
 Penicillium palmae  
 Penicillium panamense 
 Penicillium pancosmium
 Penicillium paneum 
 Penicillium panissanguineum    
 Penicillium paradoxum
 Penicillium parviverrucosum
 Penicillium parvofructum  
 Penicillium parvulum
 Penicillium parvum
 Penicillium pasqualense
 Penicillium parmonense 
 Penicillium patens
 Penicillium paxilli 
 Penicillium pedernalense  
 Penicillium penarojense
 Penicillium persicinum
 Penicillium philippinense
 Penicillium phoeniceum
 Penicillium piltunense    
 Penicillium piceum  
 Penicillium pimiteouiense 
 Penicillium pinophilum 
 Penicillium pinsaporum 
 Penicillium polonicum 
 Penicillium primulinum  
 Penicillium proteolyticum 
 Penicillium pseudostromaticum 
 Penicillium psychrosexualis
 Penicillium pullum
 Penicillium pulvis 
 Penicillium punicae  
 Penicillium punicae
 Penicillium purpurescens  
 Penicillium purpureum 
 Penicillium purpurogenum

Q

 Penicillium qii
 Penicillium quebecense

R

 Penicillium raciborskii
 Penicillium rademirici 
 Penicillium radicicola
 Penicillium radicum 
 Penicillium raistrickii  
 Penicillium ramusculum
 Penicillium ranomafanaense
 Penicillium raphiae 
 Penicillium repensicola
 Penicillium rasile
 Penicillium resedanum  
 Penicillium resticulosum 
 Penicillium restingae
 Penicillium restrictum 
 Penicillium ribium
 Penicillium riverlandense
 Penicillium robsamsonii
 Penicillium rolfsii  
 Penicillium roqueforti  
 Penicillium roseopurpureum  
 Penicillium rubefaciens 
 Penicillium rubens
 Penicillium rubidurum 
 Penicillium rubrum 
 Penicillium rudallense
 Penicillium rugulosum

S

 Penicillium sabulosum
 Penicillium sacculum 
 Penicillium sajarovii 
 Penicillium salamii
 Penicillium salmoniflumin
 Penicillium samsonianum
 Penicillium sanguifluum
 Penicillium sanshaense  
 Penicillium saturniforme 
 Penicillium scabrosum 
 Penicillium sclerotigenum 
 Penicillium senticosum 
 Penicillium severskii  
 Penicillium shennonghianum 
 Penicillium siamense
 Penicillium simile  
 Penicillium simplicissimum 
 Penicillium sinaicum
 Penicillium singorense
 Penicillium sizovae  
 Penicillium skrjabinii 
 Penicillium smithii 
 Penicillium solitum 
 Penicillium soppii 
 Penicillium spathulatum 
 Penicillium sphaerum 
 Penicillium spinulosum 
 Penicillium spirillum 
 Penicillium steckii
 Penicillium sterculiniicola
 Penicillium striatisporum 
 Penicillium stolkiae 
 Penicillium subarcticum 
 Penicillium subericola 
 Penicillium sublateritium 
 Penicillium sublectaticum
 Penicillium subrubescens 
 Penicillium subspinulosum
 Penicillium subturcoseum
 Penicillium subtile
 Penicillium sucrivorum
 Penicillium sumatrense  
 Penicillium svalbardense 
 Penicillium sylvaticum

T

 Penicillium tanzanicum
 Penicillium tardochrysogenum 
 Penicillium tardum
 Penicillium tarraconense 
 Penicillium terrenum
 Penicillium terrigenum
 Penicillium thiersii
 Penicillium thomii 
 Penicillium thymicola 
 Penicillium tricolor
 Penicillium tropicoides 
 Penicillium tropicum
 Penicillium tsitsikammaense
 Penicillium tubakianum
 Penicillium tulipae
 Penicillium turbatum
 Penicillium turcosoconidiatum

U
 
 Penicillium ubiquetum  
 Penicillium udagawae 
 Penicillium ulaiense

V

 Penicillium vagum
 Penicillium vancouverense
 Penicillium vanbeymae
 Penicillium vanderhammenii 
 Penicillium vanluykii
 Penicillium vanoranjei
 Penicillium variratens
 Penicillium variabile 
 Penicillium vasconiae 
 Penicillium velutinum 
 Penicillium venetum
 Penicillium verhagenii
 Penicillium verrucisporum
 Penicillium verrucosum 
 Penicillium verruculosum 
 Penicillium vinaceum 
 Penicillium virgatum 
 Penicillium viridicatum
 Penicillium viticola

W

 Penicillium waksmanii 
 Penicillium wellingtonense
 Penicillium westlingii  
 Penicillium williamettense 
 Penicillium wisconsinense 
 Penicillium wollemiicola 
 Penicillium wotroi

Y

 Penicillium yarmokense

Z

 Penicillium zhuangii 
 Penicillium zonatum

References

Further reading
 
 BOLDSYSTEMS
 
 ICPA A commission of the International Union of Microbiological Societies
 gni Global Names Index beta 
 
 
 

Penicillium species, List of
Penicillium